The National Institute of Environmental Health Sciences (NIEHS) conducts research into the effects of the environment on human disease, as one of the 27 institutes and centers of the National Institutes of Health (NIH).  It is located in the Research Triangle Park in North Carolina, and is the only primary division of the NIH located outside of the Washington metropolitan area.

Constitution
The National Institute of Environmental Health Sciences is a part of the National Institutes of Health, which is in turn a part of the United States Department of Health and Human Services (HHS).

The mission of the NIEHS is to "reduce the burden of human illness and disability by understanding how the environment influences the development and progression of human disease". NIEHS focuses on basic science, disease-oriented research, global environmental health, clinical research, and multidisciplinary training for researchers. 
	
NIEHS researchers and grantees have shown the deadly effects of asbestos exposure, the developmental impairment of children exposed to lead and the health effects of urban pollution. This is the laboratory of the 1994 co-recipient of the Nobel Prize in medicine, Dr. Martin Rodbell. Here scientists that same year had a key role in identifying the first breast cancer gene, BRCA1, and, in 1995, identified a gene that suppresses prostate cancer. Here is where genetically altered mice have been developed—to improve and shorten the screening of potential toxins and to help develop aspirin-like anti-inflammatory drugs with fewer side effects.

The Institute funds centers for environmental health studies at universities across the United States.

History 

In 1966, U.S. Surgeon General William H. Stewart helped to create a Division of Environmental Health Sciences within the NIH. Three years later, the division became its own institute, the National Institute of Environmental Health Sciences. Past directors include Paul Kotin, David Rall, Kenneth Olden, David A. Schwartz, and Linda Birnbaum.

Directors

Organization 
The NIEHS is one of 27 institutes and centers of the National Institutes of Health (NIH), which is a component of the Department of Health and Human Services (DHHS). Its current director is Dr. Richard Woychik, who is also concurrently the director of the National Toxicology Program. The deputy director is Dr. Trevor Archer. The director of the NIEHS reports to the director of the NIH, of which the NIEHS is a member agency. Currently, Dr. Lawrence A. Tabak is the acting director of the NIH; he in turn reports to the secretary of the HHS, Xavier Becerra.

NIEHS is composed of:
 Division of Intramural Research (DIR), which is research done at NIEHS
 Division of Extramural Research and Training, which funds research conducted elsewhere
 Division of the National Toxicology Program, which is an interagency program headquartered at NIEHS

Notes and references

External links 
 National Institute of Environmental Health Sciences official website

Environmental Health Sciences
Environmental health organizations
Medical and health organizations based in North Carolina
Research institutes in North Carolina
Medical research institutes in the United States